Sir Edward John Lees Hallstrom (25 September 1886 – 27 February 1970) was one of Australia's best-known philanthropists and businessmen of the mid 20th century.

Early life
Born at High Park station, near Coonamble, New South Wales, Hallstrom was the eighth of a family of nine children born to William Hallstrom, a saddler from England, and his Australian wife Mary Ann (née Colless). At the age of 4, his father's farm failed and the family moved to Waterloo, New South Wales, an inner-city suburb of Sydney. Hallstrom's parents separated and, by the age of 10, he was working, performing a variety of jobs to help supplement the family's income. Largely self-taught (having left school at 13), he applied himself well to both his studies and his work, and eventually took charge of a furniture factory. He later founded a business of his own, manufacturing bedsteads.

Hallstrom met his wife, Margaret Elliott Jaffrey, on a trip to Queensland. She was a talented artist, and shared his enthusiasm for birds and animals. They were married at her parents' home in the Brisbane suburb of New Farm, Queensland, on 6 April 1912. She died in 1968.

He was a Freemason.

Inventor
The Hallstroms moved to Dee Why, New South Wales, by which time Hallstrom had become interested in the young industry of refrigeration. He set about inventing in his Dee Why backyard, and in 1923 produced his first product, the Icy Ball absorption refrigerator (another kerosene-powered refrigerator, also called the Icy Ball, was later manufactured in the United States in 1927 or 1928 by Powel Crosley Jr.). Hallstrom's Icy Ball was a kerosene-powered chest model, which he designed for use in the Australian outback, where the low-tech Coolgardie safe was in widespread use. He initially went to the outback to sell these units himself.

Hallstrom expanded his product line with the development of the popular Silent Knight upright refrigerator. These were gas-powered and also electric models, and were produced in a factory in Willoughby, New South Wales under the business name of Hallstroms Pty Ltd. During World War II the factory manufactured munitions, as well as refrigerators for the use of the United States Army. By the mid-1940s, the factory was producing around 1,200 refrigerators weekly, which were exported as well as sold locally. The "Hallstrom Silent Knight" was a fairly priced, locally produced product at a time (post-war era) when imported refrigerators were very expensive. Their resulting popularity made Hallstrom a millionaire.

Philanthropy
Hallstrom is believed to have donated over A$4 million to philanthropic causes during his lifetime.  He directed much of his fortune to the Taronga Park Zoo in Sydney, becoming a trustee and later chairman of the zoo. He personally funded the purchase of many large and exotic species from overseas. He established a farm to produce fresh food for the zoo animals, and also set up a fauna reserve on the outskirts of Sydney, later to form part of the Muogamarra Nature Reserve. His company sponsored a conservation-oriented panel program Nature Speaks from 1947–54 on radio 2GB, compered by John Dease.
Hallstrom was also generous in his financial gifts to hospitals and medical research centres as well as numerous charities. His reputation as a philanthropist resulted in his being besieged with requests for financial assistance, and he was known to take personal interest in the many letters and requests he received.

Hallstrom was a member of zoological societies in Sydney (Royal Zoological Society of New South Wales), London (Zoological Society of London) and New York (New York Zoological Society) and was also a member of the Explorers Club and the Royal Australian Historical Society.

Honours

Hallstrom was knighted in 1952, and received gold medals from zoological societies in Belgium and San Diego, California.  He also received an honorary Swedish knighthood.

He was also the first Australian to be named "Father of the Year", in 1957.

Taronga Zoo
In the latter part of his life Hallstrom was involved in controversy over his concept of the development of the Taronga Zoo, with two state government inquiries criticising his lack of professional training in zoology as well as the extent of his use of concrete in animal enclosures. According to biographer Audrey Tate, 

He died at Northbridge, New South Wales, on 27 February 1970.

References

External links

 Taronga Zoo History
 The end of a unique institution
 Good zoos
 1968 interview with Hallstrom

1886 births
1970 deaths
Australian philanthropists
Australian Knights Bachelor
20th-century philanthropists
20th-century Australian businesspeople